Baía de São Jorge is a bay of the Atlantic Ocean on the south coast of the island of São Nicolau in Cape Verde. The only important settlement on the bay is the port village of Preguiça.

References

Bays of Cape Verde
Ribeira Brava, Cape Verde
Geography of Santiago, Cape Verde